Roy Vincent Graham (February 22, 1895 – April 26, 1933) was a catcher in Major League Baseball. He played for the Chicago White Sox.

References

External links

1895 births
1933 deaths
Major League Baseball catchers
Chicago White Sox players
Baseball players from San Francisco